Events from the year 1958 in Ireland.

Incumbents
 President: Seán T. O'Kelly
 Taoiseach: Éamon de Valera (FF)
 Tánaiste: Seán Lemass (FF)
 Minister for Finance: James Ryan (FF)
 Chief Justice: Conor Maguire
 Dáil: 16th
 Seanad: 9th

Events
6 February – Billy Whelan, a 22-year-old forward who played four times for the Irish national football team, was among 21 people killed in the Munich air disaster involving English football league champions Manchester United. He had played nearly 100 times for United in the space of three years, scoring 52 goals and winning two league titles.
18 March – Taoiseach Éamon de Valera said he would be willing to have talks with the government of Northern Ireland on wider economic co-operation.
20 March – Work began on the £80,000 restoration of the State Rooms at Dublin Castle.
10 May – The Independent TD, Jack Murphy, resigned in protest at the indifference of the main political parties to the plight of the unemployed.
12 May – Ardmore Film Studios were opened by Seán Lemass.
22 May – The Minister for Education, Jack Lynch, told the Dáil that the ruling requiring women teachers to retire on marriage is to be revoked.
25 July – £100 damages were awarded to a nine-year-old who was beaten by his teacher in a national school.
28 July – The Carlisle Monument, an eight-foot bronze statue in the Phoenix Park in Dublin, was blown up in the early hours.
6 August – Australian athlete Herb Elliott shattered the world record for the mile at Santry Stadium in Dublin, recording a time of 3 minutes 54.5 seconds.
8 August – The US Embassy in Merrion Square displayed plans for a new embassy in Dublin.
8 September – Pan Am's Boeing 707 became the first jetliner to touch down on European soil at Shannon Airport.
29 October – The Government announced that the question of ending the proportional representation method of voting was to be put to the people in a referendum.
4 November – In the Vatican, Taoiseach Éamon de Valera attended the four-hour coronation of Pope John XXIII.
31 December – The Harcourt Street railway line in Dublin, serving Ranelagh, Milltown, Dundrum, Stillorgan, Foxrock, Carrickmines, Shankill and Bray, closed.

Arts and literature
 21 February – Desmond Guinness established the Irish Georgian Society for the promotion of Georgian architecture.
 16 June – Brendan Behan's one-act Irish language play  was first performed at the Damer Theatre in Dublin.
 28 October – Samuel Beckett's monologue Krapp's Last Tape was first performed by Patrick Magee at the Royal Court Theatre, London.
 Samuel Beckett's novel The Unnamable was published in English.
 Behan's autobiographical Borstal Boy was published in London. On 12 November it was banned in Ireland by the Censorship of Publications Board.
 Thomas Kinsella's poetry Another September was published in Dublin.
 Patrick MacDonogh's poetry One Landscape Still was published.
 John Montague's poetry Forms of Exile was published.
 The Oxford Book of Irish Verse, XVIIth century-XXth century, edited by Donagh MacDonagh and Lennox Robinson, was published.

Sports

Association football

 Football World Cup

(The Republic of Ireland did not qualify for the 1958 world cup)

Northern Ireland:

Group stage
Northern Ireland 1–1 Czechoslovakia
Northern Ireland 1–1 Argentina
Northern Ireland 1–1 West Germany
Northern Ireland entered group playoff stage
Northern Ireland 2–1 Czechoslovakia AET
Northern Ireland qualified for the quarterfinal stage
Northern Ireland 0–4 France
Northern Ireland were knocked out at the quarterfinal stage

Births
1 January – Liam Fennelly, Kilkenny hurler
27 January – Synan Braddish, soccer player
1 February – Seán Fleming, Fianna Fáil TD for Laois–Offaly
2 February – Paddy Prendergast, Kilkenny hurler
16 February – Fintan O'Toole, journalist and drama critic
1 April – Stephen O'Rahilly, Irish-British physician and academic 
19 April – Denis O'Brien, entrepreneur
30 April – James Hewitt, soldier and lover of Diana, Princess of Wales
6 May
Tommy Byrne, motor racing driver
Ivor Callely, Fianna Fáil politician, member of the 23rd Seanad Éireann, TD and Minister of State
8 May – Roddy Doyle, novelist, dramatist and screenwriter
11 May – Conor Hayes, Galway hurler and manager
2 June – John Buckley, Cork hurler
7 June – Aidan Fogarty, Offaly hurler
8 June
Louise Richardson, political scientist and university vice-chancellor
Niall Williams, writer
5 July – Veronica Guerin, journalist (murdered by drug dealers in 1996)
10 July – Fiona Shaw, actress
11 July – Martin Doherty, member of the Provisional Irish Republican Army
16 July – Michael Flatley, American dancer
10 September – Siobhan Fahey, musician
16 September – Maura O'Connell, singer
18 September – John Aldridge, Irish international soccer player, in England of Irish descent
11 November – John Devine, soccer player
21 November – Eddie O'Sullivan, head coach of the Ireland national rugby union team

Full date unknown
Noel Hill, concertina player
Glenn Meade, fiction writer

Deaths
1 January – Richard Hayes, doctor and Sinn Féin MP (born 1878)
17 January – Michael Donohoe, Irish-born American politician, Democratic U.S. Representative from Pennsylvania (born 1864)
24 March – Seamus O'Sullivan, poet and editor (born 1879)
29 March – Jimmy Archer, Major League baseball player (born 1883)
24 April – Mabel McConnell Fitzgerald, republican, suffragette and socialist (born 1884]
6 July – John Esmonde, soldier, Fine Gael TD (born 1893)
28 July – Dick Walsh, Kilkenny hurler (born 1878)
13 August – James Lennon, member of 1st Dáil representing the County Carlow constituency
24 August – Paul Henry, artist (born 1876)
9 September – Máire Nic Shiubhlaigh, actress and Republican activist (born 1883)
15 October – Lennox Robinson, dramatist, poet and theatre director and producer (born 1886)
2 December – Alan McKibbin, businessman and Ulster Unionist Party MP (born 1892)
8 December – Peig Sayers (Máiréad Ó Gaoithín), seanachaí (traditional storyteller) (born 1873)
19 December – Arthur Gore, 6th Earl of Arran, Anglo-Irish peer and soldier (born 1868)
23 December – Dorothy Macardle, author and historian (born 1889)
24 December – Martin O'Brien, hurler (Thurles Sarsfields, Tipperary) (born 1885)

References

 
1950s in Ireland
Ireland
Years of the 20th century in Ireland